Baptiste Amar (born November 11, 1979) is a French former professional ice hockey defenceman who participated at the 2010 IIHF World Championship as a member of the France National men's ice hockey team.

International
Amar was named to the France men's national ice hockey team for competition at the 2014 IIHF World Championship.

Career statistics

Regular season and playoffs

FRA totals do not include numbers from the 2000–01 season.

International

References

External links

1979 births
Living people
Brûleurs de Loups players
Dragons de Rouen players
French ice hockey defencemen
Ice hockey players at the 2002 Winter Olympics
LHC Les Lions players
Olympic ice hockey players of France
People from Gap, Hautes-Alpes
Rögle BK players
Sportspeople from Hautes-Alpes
UMass Lowell River Hawks men's ice hockey players
French expatriate ice hockey people
French expatriate sportspeople in the United States